Vincent Cirelli is a film special effects supervisor, producer and head of production. He is known for his works at Stan Winston Studios and Luma Pictures as a visual effects supervisor.

Select filmography
Pirates of the Caribbean: At World's End  (2007)
No Country for Old Men (2007)
X-Men Origins: Wolverine (2008)
Harry Potter and the Half-Blood Prince (2009)
The Book of Eli (2010)
Battle: Los Angeles (2011)
Captain America: The First Avenger (2012)
Prometheus (2012)
The Avengers (2012)
Saving Mr. Banks (2013)
Guardians of the Galaxy (2014)
Avengers: Age of Ultron (2015)
In the Heart of the Sea (2015)
Deadpool (2015)
Doctor Strange (2016), for which he received an Academy Award for Best Visual Effects nomination at the 89th Academy Awards in 2017.

Awards and nomination
 Nominated: Academy Award for Best Visual Effects - Doctor Strange
 Winner: Seattle Film Critics Awards - Doctor Strange
 Nominated: BAFTA Award for Best Special Visual Effects - Doctor Strange
Nominated: Outstanding Visual Effects in a Commercial - Coca-Cola: A Mini Marvel
 Nominated: Satellite Award for Best Visual Effects - Doctor Strange 
Nominated: Visual Effects Society Award for Outstanding Visual Effects in an Effects Driven Feature Motion Picture - Doctor Strange
Nominated: Gold Derby Award - Doctor Strange
Nominated: OFTA Television Award - Best Visual Effects in a Series - Agents of S.H.I.E.L.D. (2013)

References

External links
 

Special effects people

Living people
Year of birth missing (living people)